Sir Felix Booth, 1st Baronet, FRS (16 July 1780 Clerkenwell – 24 January 1850 Brighton, Sussex) was a wealthy British gin distiller, and promoter of Arctic exploration, with various places in Nunavut, Canada, being named after him.

Life and family
Sir Felix Booth's ancestry traces back beyond the 13th century when his family were lords of the manor of Barton, Lancashire. Five generations later, Sir John Booth (1350–1422) wed twice at Eccles parish church where the Booths were patrons of the living, firstly to Joan Trafford (died 1411) and secondly to Maude Savage, collectively producing thirteen children (and two Archbishops of York).

Their eldest son Sir Thomas Booth (1395–1482) married Isabel Carrington, in 1431, before settling on family estates in Lincolnshire. The second son, Sir Robert Booth made a particularly advantageous marriage in 1409 to Dulcia Venables, thereby inheriting de jure uxoris the vast Massey estates in North-West England and whose descendants were ennobled in the 17th century as Barons Delamer then Earls of Warrington. Other family cadets include the Booth baronets (of Allerton Beeches), the Gore-Booth baronets, Lois Frances Booth (Countess of Rosenborg) and Dr Claire Booth (Countess of Ulster).

Sir Thomas and Lady Isabel (née Carrington) had seven offspring giving rise to two Booth families in Lincolnshire: William Booth married Ann Ashton at Goxhill founding the "Booths of Goxhill", whilst their younger son Henry Booth (1425–1500), who became Deputy Admiral of the North, married Elizabeth Gascoyn in 1460, being progenitors of the "Booths of Killingholme" following the marriage of Sir John Booth (1582–1617) with the heiress Elizabeth Ayscough; they are ancestors of the Booth baronets of Portland Place.

Five generations later, John Booth of Killingholme (1556–1597) married Martha Butler circa 1573 and they had four offspring, of which their son George Booth (1582–1617) married in 1607 Elizabeth Monckton. Their son Captain William Booth (1608–1657) married at Market Rasen on 13 June 1631 Elizabeth Wright, daughter of John Wright. Captain Booth's marriage produced ten offspring, of whom their son Thomas Booth, born 1639 (who would become Sir Felix Booth's 2× great-grandfather), married at Market Rasen on 23 November 1670 Elizabeth Middlemore (died 1687), producing four sons and four daughters: their first son Revd John Booth (1672–1717) was Rector of Lusby (becoming Sir Felix Booth's 1× great-grandfather) marrying Elizabeth Sanderson on 20 June 1700 at Ulceby, their third son Captain Robert Booth (1677–1742) marrying Lady Susannah Clinton (1680–1754), only daughter of the 6th Earl of Lincoln and their fourth son Very Rev Dr Penyston Booth (1681–1765) marrying Katherine Jones, daughter of Revd Dr Edward Jones.

From the marriage of Revd John Booth and Elizabeth Sanderson in 1700, their second son William Booth, born 1703, married Alice Green on 25 July 1729 at Ulceby and they would have eight children comprising six boys and two girls. It would be their first son Richard Booth, born 22 July 1730, who would be Sir Felix Booth's first cousin once removed. Richard married Ann Hill in 1753 at Irby upon Humber near Caistor and took up residence in the village of Caistor. Richard and Ann had nine children comprising six sons and three daughters and their last born son Samuel Booth, born 1773, married Ann Wastnedge in 1799 and had a son named Felix Booth, born 1805. Richard Booth died in 1800 aged 70. It was reported in The Gentleman's Magazine in 1840 that "the late Richard Booth's daughter Miss Elizabeth Booth of Caistor Lincolnshire died on 22nd April 1840 in her 82nd year. She was a cousin to Sir Felix Booth".

From the marriage of John Booth and Elizabeth Sanderson on 20 June 1700 at Ulceby, their third son John Booth, born 1711 (who would become Sir Felix Booth's grandfather), made his way to London and became involved in the distillery business, from which a major British company would evolve. John Booth married a Mary Watts on 3 January 1739 at Westminster London, and by 1740, John Booth was aged 29 years and Booth's Gin was very popular. John and Mary produced at least four offspring including their son Philip Booth who was born during 1745 (substantiated by his obituary saying he died on 5 May 1818 aged 73). A second son John Booth was born 1748 and reference to him was reported in The Gentleman's Magazine in 1804 when it said "John Booth's youngest daughter Jane died in her seventeenth year at Caistor Lincolnshire". She was presumably visiting or staying with her Uncle Richard Booth and Aunt Ann Booth. Nothing is known about the remaining offspring.

Around 1760, Philip Booth joined his father John in the family business and in about 1771, he married Elizabeth Walls, whose father lived – as did Philip – in the new and fashionable Russell Square on the Bedford Estate in Bloomsbury London. Philip and Elizabeth produced seven children, comprising four sons and three daughters, Elizabeth, born 18 July 1773 + William, born 25 July 1774 + John Gillyat, born 17 March 1776 + Mary, born 15 August 1777 + Philip, born 24 November 1778 + Felix, born 16 July 1780 + Alice, born 4 August 1782. In the Directory of Merchants for 1778, when Philip was aged 33, there is the entry of the firm Philip Booth and Company, Distillers, of 55 Turnmill Street in Clerkenwell London.  Philip's three sons William, John Gillyat and Felix would join the family business and be groomed as successors.  However shortly before Philip's death in 1818, the original family partnership was dissolved and a new one established between the brothers John Gillyat aged 40 and Felix aged 36. Together they had – to a great extent – rebuilt the Turnmill Street premises and it would be Felix who subsequently obtained sole control of the business.

With energy and drive, Felix expanded the business by building a second distillery at Brentford on the River Thames just six miles from Hyde Park Corner, and purchasing the neighbouring brewery of Hazard and Company, which he renamed as the Red Lion Brewery. By establishing a distillery at Edinburgh in Scotland, Felix Booth could then boast that he was the owner of the biggest distilling business in Great Britain. In 1828, now aged 48, he was elected a Sheriff of the City of London and of the County of Middlesex. Felix had now accumulated considerable wealth and decided to use his money to privately fund a voyage of exploration to the Arctic Seas, financing Captain Ross and his twenty-two companions, equipped with stores and supplies to last several years, on a voyage on the paddle-steamer "Victory". They departed from Woolwich Reach on 23 May 1829 and returned to Hull, Yorkshire on 18 October 1833, having survived many exploratory experiences. Whilst Captain Ross had failed to open up a North-West passage, he had dramatically narrowed the field for future expeditions by mapping an area of over half-million square miles. For Felix Booth's financial contribution to such an effort, he was knighted by the King and created a baronet "as a reward for his patriotism in fitting out at his sole cost an expedition in the endeavour to discover a North-West Passage".
 
In 1832, Sir Felix Booth bought the site of the old Ophthalmic Hospital in Albany Street, Regent's Park as a site for his distillery. In 1840, he went into partnership with William Grimble to experiment with producing vinegar from the spirits left over from the manufacturing process. The site was in the north-east corner of Cumberland Market. The venture was unsuccessful so Sir Felix reverted to the more conventional method of vinegar brewing.

Between 1840 and 1843, Sir Felix Booth was faced with a blackmail situation and it was ultimately taken to court in 1843. Sir Felix had a second cousin once removed also named Felix Booth, born 1805, being the grandson of Richard Booth of Caistor Lincolnshire. Felix, no doubt envious of Sir Felix's wealth, threatened – with the intent to exhort money – to reveal to the police that Sir Felix had committed unlawful sexual crimes, namely homosexual relations with a young man named Marr. Sir Felix attended the hearing in Hull Yorkshire, vigorously denying the claims asserted by Felix.  Sir Felix admitted to the court that he had fathered a male child with a Scottish woman in Edinburgh that he was very fond of, and had financially assisted the child through his growth years. This situation had made Felix insanely jealous. The 'love child' was referred in the court as simply Mr Marr. The court ruled Sir Felix to be innocent and Felix was found guilty of blackmail and sentenced to twenty years' transportation to Australia.

William Bradley (1801–1857), one of England's leading painters / engravers of the era painted a portrait of Sir Felix Booth around 1850, coloured in a mezzo-tint style which hung in the Court Room of the Coopers' Company until its destruction in an air raid over London during World War II.

Sir Felix Booth died unexpectedly of heart failure whilst staying in a seaside hotel at Brighton in 1850, aged 69. His funeral procession was staged with all the solemn pageantry of the Victorian period, and passed respectful bare-headed villagers lining the roadside in Edmonton and Hoddesdon. Six horses, preceded by outriders, drew the hearse, six coaches of mourners followed it and Sir Felix's private carriage, empty of passengers, brought up the rear. It was said that "Sir Felix Booth dies generally and justly lamented. he was in every respect a princely citizen of London. His immense wealth, acquired by his own industry, was devoted to the benefit or enjoyment of others. His disposition was amiable and his habits splendid. He took delight in hospitality and in acts of kindness and charity".

Sir Felix Booth had not married but his illegitimate son John Marshall Marr – mentioned in the 1843 Hull Court hearing as simply Mr Marr – married Emma Minchin on 26 September 1836 at Exeter in Devon, and they produced eight daughters and four sons, named George, born 1837 + William, born 1845 + Arthur, born 1852 + John, born 1855. John Marshall Marr was adequately benefited by the Will of Sir Felix Booth.

Booth's Gin, owned by Diageo, ceased production in 2017. In November 2018, the brand was sold to the Sazerac Company.

Geographical expeditions
Fascinated by science, Booth financed John Ross's 1829 expedition to find the Northwest Passage. The Boothia Peninsula and Gulf of Boothia are named after him.

He provided £17,000 for the expenses of the expedition, to which Captain (later Sir John) Ross had added £3,000, and the result was an immense stride in the progress of geographical science. The grateful commander bestowed the name of his patron upon several of his discoveries on land and sea – Gulf of Boothia, Isthmus of Boothia, Continent of Boothia Felix, Felix Harbor, Cape Felix, and Sheriff's Harbor: the district with the islands, rivers, lakes, &c., extending to 74° N. latitude along the north-eastern portion of North America.

The discovery most important to geographical science was that of the magnetic pole at 96° 46' 45" W. longitude, and 70° 5' 17".

Honours and distinctions
Having served as Alderman and Master of the Worshipful Company of Coopers, Booth was elected Sheriff of London in 1828.

A founding Fellow of the Royal Geographical Society, Booth was elected a Fellow of the Royal Society on 10 April 1834.

In recognition of his funding the successful Arctic expedition, he was created a baronet as Booth of Portland Place, co. Middlesex and Great Catwood, co. Huntingdon on 27 March 1835, with special remainder, in default of his own legitimate male issue, to the heirs male of his eldest brother, William Booth, of Roydon Hall, Essex. His nephew, Sir Williamson Booth (1810–1877), succeeded him as 2nd baronet.

See also
 Booth baronets
 Booth's Gin
 Nunavut

References

Attribution

External links
www.coopers-hall.co.uk
www.royalsociety.org
www.state.vt.us (1740, establishment of Booth's Gin)

1780 births
1850 deaths
People from Lincolnshire
People from Clerkenwell
19th-century British people
Businesspeople from London
Exploration of the Arctic
Baronets in the Baronetage of the United Kingdom
Councilmen and Aldermen of the City of London
Sheriffs of the City of London
Fellows of the Royal Society
Distilleries in the United Kingdom
Felix Booth
19th-century British businesspeople